Santa Cruz is a district of the Turrialba canton, in the Cartago province of Costa Rica.

History 
Santa Cruz was created on 14 February 1920 by Decreto 28. Segregated from Alvarado canton.

Geography 
Santa Cruz has an area of  km² and an elevation of  metres.

Demographics 

For the 2011 census, Santa Cruz had a population of  inhabitants.

Transportation

Road transportation 
The district is covered by the following road routes:
 National Route 230
 National Route 417

Economy

Tourism
The Guayabo National Monument is located between this district and Santa Teresita district, both in Turrialba canton.

Dairy farms
The Turrialba cheese is originally from and produced in this district.

References 

Districts of Cartago Province
Populated places in Cartago Province